The 1957 International cricket season was from April 1957 to August 1957, which consisted only a single international tour.

Season overview

May

West Indies in England

References

1957 in cricket